Sherkat-e Parseylun (also Romanized as Sherkāt-e Pārseylūn; also known as Sherkāt-e Khāneh Hāye Sāzmānī and Sherkāt-e Khāneh Sāzī-ye Āz̄arbāyjān) is a village in Koregah-e Sharqi Rural District, in the Central District of Khorramabad County, Lorestan Province, Iran. At the 2006 census, its population was 277, in 65 families.

References 

Towns and villages in Khorramabad County